The Gimnasia Realit or the Gimnasia Realit E. Karary is an Israeli high school, named in honor of its first principal Eliezer Karary.

History
It was established in 1939 in Rishon LeZion at the time of the 1936–39 Arab revolt during the Mandatory Palestine. It was the fifth high school in Israel and the first in Rishon LeZion. The school's first learning programs were devoted to humanities, in contrast with the present emphasis on the sciences, such as biotechnology and the TG (Talented and Gifted) classes. It merged with two middle schools in 2011.

The Gimnasia's first location was on Herzl street in a three-room apartment and only 9 students graduated in its first year. The second housing of the school was on Abrahmovich neighbourhood, until the last move to Smilchansky street, where it is located as of 2013.

Principals
 Eliezer Karary - 1939-1970
 Gamliel Segal - 1970-1997
 Shosh Winter - 1997-2012
 Dalia Yeshaya - 2012-2018
 Iris Ron - 2018-current

Notable alumni
 Tal Dunne (born 1987), Welsh-born Israeli professional basketball player for Ironi Nes Ziona
Igor Nesterenko (born 1990), Israeli-Ukrainian basketball player in the Israel Basketball Premier League

References

External links

 Official website

Educational institutions established in 1939
Schools in Israel
1939 establishments in Mandatory Palestine